Monsignor Júlio Renato Lancellotti (born December 27, 1948) is a Brazilian Catholic educator and priest, Monsignor and parish priest of the São Miguel Arcanjo Church in the Mooca neighborhood, in the city of São Paulo. In addition to the parish, he is also responsible for the masses held in the chapel of the Universidade São Judas Tadeu, located in the same neighborhood.

Lancelotti is known by his work with homeless and vulnerable people, children and adolescents, with the Pastoral do Povo da Rua (Pastoral of the People of the Street).

Early life and education 
Lancelotti was born in the city of São Paulo, in the district of Belém, the second of the three children of the couple Wilma Ferrari and Milton Fagundes Lancellotti. His father owned a grocery store and his mother worked as a secretary before becoming a homeowner.

Lancelotti started his formal education at Educandário Espírito Santo, maintained by the Missionary Servants of the Holy Ghost, in Tatuapé. At the age of twelve, he entered the seminary in Araraquara, but, uncomfortable with the severeness of the institution, he returned to São Paulo, where he finished high school at an Augustinian school.

Once again he decided to prepare for his religious career, he became a friar, but at the age of nineteen he left the monastical life again. In the meantime, he completed a nursing assistant course at Santa Casa de Misericórdia in Bragança Paulista and started to practice the profession. He then joined the Faculdades Oswaldo Cruz and completed the Pedagogy course. Then, he specialized in Educational Guidance at the Pontifical Catholic University of São Paulo, where he served as assistant professor to Professor Carlos Alberto Andreucci, in addition to teaching classes at the colleges Oswaldo Cruz, Castro Alves, Piratininga and at the Nossa Senhora Auxiliadora Institute, the last, geared towards preparing for teaching. Lancellotti also worked at the Social Service for Minors, which later became the Municipal Secretariat for Social Assistance and Development, and the Immigrant Support Center in Brás, giving classes to children with learning difficulties.

In 1980, he met Dom Luciano Pedro Mendes de Almeida, then auxiliary bishop of São Paulo, and they became very close. Together, they made all the foundations for the Pastoral do Menor of the Archdiocese of São Paulo. A year later, he began to study theology and was ordained a priest on April 20, 1985.

Social work

Lancelotti works with juvenile offenders, inmates on assisted liberty, HIV / AIDS patients and low-income and homeless populations. He believes in the human being above all, "as the image and likeness of God" and considers that all citizens should have their rights respected.

On July 26, 1991, he founded "Casa Vida I" and, later, "Casa Vida II", homes to welcome children with HIV. As episcopal vicar of the People of the Street of the Archdiocese of São Paulo, he is in charge of several municipal projects to assist the needy population, such as the program "A Gente na Rua", formed by community health agents, former homeless people

Awards 
The Human Rights Commission of the Brazilian Bar Association gave him the Franz de Castro Holzwarth Award in 2000 for his work against the systematic violation of the rights of children and adolescents.

References

20th-century Brazilian Roman Catholic priests
Brazilian human rights activists
Pontifical Catholic University of São Paulo alumni
21st-century Brazilian Roman Catholic priests
1948 births
Living people